Rudolf John Gorsleben (16 March 1883 – 23 August 1930) was a German Ariosophist, Armanist (practitioner of the Armanen runes), journal editor and playwright.

Life
Gorsleben was born in Metz. During World War I, he fought in a German unit stationed in the Ottoman Empire. He formed the Edda Society (Edda-Gesellschaft) and wrote the book Hoch-Zeit der Menschheit (The Zenith of Humanity), first published in 1930. It is known as "The Bible of Armanism" and has been translated into English by Karl Hans Welz.

Gorsleben died in Bad Homburg of a chronic heart complaint.

Quotes
"The healing power of medical drugs is the Ur-power of their original essence in conjunction with the power of Ur-vibrations of the human-Divine combination that is composed of body, soul and spirit." - Hoch-Zeit der Menschheit (English edition)
"With the introduction of Runic knowledge the generation of our days can achieve the control of secret powers within the life of their soul and reach the Spring-Root, which is the Whole of the Runes, the All-Raune, which opens all spiritual treasures to us, if we are Children of the Sunday, Children of the Sun, Children ("Kinder") of the Ar (Eagle, Sun), announcers ("Künder") of the Ar, people knowledgeable ("Könner" in modern German) of the Ar, Ar-koner, persons knowledgeable in the Ar-Kana (Arkana = arcane wisdom) or if we strive to become all of the above. The Runes have their own lives, they are true magical signs, from which we can draw the Spirit to Advise and the Courage to Action." - Hoch-Zeit der Menschheit (English edition)

Gorsleben's Periodicals
 Deutsche Freiheit. Monatsschrift für Arische Gottes- und Welterkenntnis. Ed. Rudolf John Gorsleben, 1925 to 1926, Munich (3.1925 and 4.1926)
 Arische Freiheit. Monatsschrift für arische Gottes- u. Welterkenntnis, 1927, Dinkelsbühl (5.1927)
 Hag-All, All-Hag. Zeitschrift für arische Freiheit, Edda-Gesellschaft, 1930 to 1934, Mittenwald, Obb. (7.1930 to 11.1934)

Written works
Der Freibeuter, Drama , 1913
Der Rastäquar, Drama, 1913
Die königliche Waschfrau, Lustspiel, 1918
Die Überwindung des Judentums in uns und außer uns. 71 S., Deutscher Volksverlag Dr. Ernst Boepple, München 1920
Die Edda. Übertragen von Rudolf John Gorsleben. Die Heimkehr (W. Simon, Buchdr. u. Verlag), Pasing 1920
Gedichte, 1921
 Das Blendwerk der Götter (Gylfaginning). Aus d. jüngeren Edda ins Hoch-Deutsche übertr. von Rudolf John Gorsleben. 75 S., Die Heimkehr (W. Simon, Buchdr. u. Verlag), Pasing 1923
 Die Edda, Band 1. Lieder- Edda. Heldenlieder, Sprüche, Götterlieder - was wirklich in der Edda steht. Reprint von 2002 
Festschrift zum fünfundzwanzigjährigen Bestehen des Hammer 1901 - 1926. Den Mitarbeitern zugeeignet, Hammer, Leipzig, 1926. Sammelwerk. Enthält: Rudolf John Gorsleben: Gedanken um Zeit und Ewigkeit
 Das Geheimnis von Dinkelsbühl. Eine tiefgründige und doch kurzweilige Abhandlung über den Ursprung der Stadt, ihre Geschichte, die Herkunft des Wappens, über den Brauch der uralten „Kinderzeche” und über die Bedeutung einer rätselhaften Inschrift der Geheimen Bruderschaft der Bauhütte, hauptsächlich an Hand der Kenntnis der Runen / entdeckt, entziffert u. erklärt von Rudolf John Gorsleben, 70 S., Brückner, Berlin 1928 (Wunder der Heimat, H. 1)
 Das Geheimnis von Dinkelsbühl... Reprint: Antiquariat an der Segringer Straße, Dinkelsbühl 2004.
 Hoch-Zeit der Menschheit.  XXV, 689 S., Ill., Koehler & Amelang, Leipzig 1930
 Hoch-Zeit der Menschheit.  XXV, 689 S., Ill., Neudr. der Ausgabe Leipzig 1930, Faksimile-Verl./Versand, Bremen 1981 (Historische Faksimiles)
 Hoch-Zeit der Menschheit''.  XXV, 764 S., Ill., Faks.-Nachdr. der Ausg. Leipzig 1930, Faks.-Verl., Bremen 1993  (Serie Forschungsreihe „Historische Faksimiles”)

Notes

External links
 
 Hoch-Zeit der Menschheit in PDF-format . In English.

Germanic mysticism
German occultists
German military personnel of World War I
Writers from Metz
People from Alsace-Lorraine
Ottoman military personnel of World War I
1883 births
1930 deaths
Thule Society members